A Palestinian suicide bombing was carried out on September 9, 2003 in Café Hillel in German Colony, Jerusalem. Seven people were killed in the attack and over 50 were injured.

A few hours prior to the Café Hillel bombing, Palestinian militants carried out a suicide attack in a bus stop next to the military base Tzrifin.

The attack
On Tuesday evening, 9 September 2003 a Palestinian suicide bomber approached the "Café Hillel" coffee shop in the German Colony neighborhood of Jerusalem. Security guard Alon Mizrahi was attempting to prevent the bomber from entering when he blew himself up. At 11:20 pm the bomber detonated the explosive device he carried on his body.

Among those killed in the attack were Dr. David Applebaum, head of the emergency room at Shaare Zedek Medical Center in Jerusalem, and his daughter Nava, who was to have been married the day after the bombing.

Perpetrator 
The attack was perpetrated by the Hamas member Ramez Abu Salim who originated from the village of Rantis, and had been a student at Bir Zeit University.

Aftermath 
In July 2004 Israeli military forces arrested members of a Palestinian militant squad who were involved in the execution and planning of many attacks, including the Café Hillel bombing.

On 14 March 2010 Israeli military forces caught the Hamas militant leader Maher Udda, whom participated in the execution of both these suicide attacks as well as other terrorist attack.

See also 
 Tzrifin bus stop attack

References

External links
Suicide Bombings- Tzrifin and Jerusalem - September 9- 2003 - published at the Israeli Ministry of Foreign Affairs
 Memorial video on YouTube
 Two separate suicide bombings kill at least 15 in Israel - published on USA Today on September 9, 2003
 2nd Deadly Bomb Blast Hits Israel - published on CBS News on September 9, 2003
 Attacks wreck peace hopes - published on BBC News on September 9, 2003

Mass murder in 2003
Terrorist incidents in Jerusalem
2003 in Jerusalem
September 2003 events in Asia
Hamas suicide bombings
Attacks_on_bakeries
Terrorist incidents in Jerusalem in the 2000s
Building bombings in Israel